Kim Ji-soo (born 30 March 1993), professionally known as Ji Soo, is a South Korean actor.

Early life and education
In elementary school, Ji Soo was a judo athlete and competed at national level before giving it up due to injuries. He was an actor trainee under JYP Entertainment in 2012.

Ji Soo is a student of Digital Seoul Culture Arts University, where he majors in Film.

Career
Ji Soo made his acting debut on stage in 2009 and consequently starred in several short films, including having a leading role in the Korean-Filipino independent film Seoul Mates. He first gained recognition in high school drama Angry Mom (2015).

Since then, he has starred in television series Cheer Up! (2015), Page Turner (2016) and Moon Lovers: Scarlet Heart Ryeo (2016); as well as the film One Way Trip (2016).

In 2017, he co-starred in JTBC's fantasy romance comedy Strong Woman Do Bong-soon, playing a passionate rookie police officer. He next starred in OCN's crime drama Bad Guys 2.

In 2018, Ji Soo was cast in JTBC's drama special Ping Pong Ball, and Netflix's youth romance drama My First First Love.

In 2020, Ji Soo signed a contract with KeyEast.

In 2021, Ji Soo was approved to play the part as the male lead role in the Korean drama River Where the Moon Rises. The drama began airing on 15 February 2021 with the actor Ji Soo portraying the character role of On Dal. He starred in the drama for six aired episodes until reported school bullying and assault accusations were made against him, hence KBS replaced Ji Soo so he was from then on removed from the show. The role of On Dal was re-cast by actor Na In Woo, that then appeared from episode nine onward of the drama.

Actor Ji Soo was announced to be enlisted for mandatory military service duties in October 2021, reports say that Ji Soo received mandatory military service duties summon in December 2020. After completed four weeks of basic military training, he was announced to carry out the rest of his services in the assigned social worker department.

On 6 July 2021, the legal representative of Ji Soo, law company Shin & Kim, revealed a new statement about the open-ended legal procedures of before-reported school bullying and assault allegations. In May 2021, the same representative has stated the actor has decided to take legal action against the people who made false accusations and spread false rumors.	
 On May 27, 2021, Ji Soo's agency KeyEast announced that his exclusive contract with the agency has been terminated due to the controversy.

Personal life
Ji Soo received surgery for acute osteomyelitis (inflammation of bone or bone marrow, usually due to infection) on 13 September 2016. On 27 September, he returned to filming Fantastic and was officially discharged from the hospital on 1 October.

He is part of a celebrity group of friends known as BYH48 which consists of EXO's Suho, Ryu Jun-yeol, Byun Yo-han, Lee Dong-hwi and more. The name was coined by their fans, with BYH referring to Byun Yo-han - the group's leader - and 48 is a parody of Japanese idol group AKB48. 
Ji Soo is also best friends with fellow actor Nam Joo-hyuk.

Controversy
In a statement posted on an online forum by an anonymous person on March 2, 2021, Ji Soo was accused of being a bully during his school years. The following day, his agency, KeyEast, released a statement saying that "[they] are looking at this incident seriously and will do [their] utmost to verify the facts."

Following a series of similar accusations, Ji Soo posted a hand-written apology to his Instagram account on 4 March 2021. He stated:

It was later reported that Ji Soo would be replaced by actor Na In-woo in the television series River Where the Moon Rises. KeyEast issued a statement confirming Ji Soo's activities will be halted prior to his military enlistment in October 2021.

Filmography

Film

Television series

Web series

Television shows

Music video appearances

Theater

Awards and nominations

References

External links
 
 
 
 

21st-century South Korean male actors
South Korean male television actors
South Korean male film actors
South Korean male stage actors
South Korean male web series actors
Living people
1993 births